Three vessels have served the Royal Navy, albeit briefly, under the name HMS Charlotte.
 HMS Charlotte (1797) was a brig of eight guns purchased in the Leeward Islands that wrecked on Hispaniola on 21 December 1797, within four months of her purchase. Because she wrecked so quickly, she was never entered into Admiralty records. All her crew made it to shore on her fallen masts. There the Spaniards took them prisoner and marched them to Santiago. Her commander was Lieutenant John Thicknesse.
  was an eight-gun schooner purchased in the Leeward Islands in 1797 that a French privateer captured in October 1798 while she was under the command of Lieutenant Thicknesse.
 HMS Charlotte (1800) was a schooner purchased in 1800. She was armed with six 3-pounder guns and wrecked on 28 March 1801 on the Île à Vache while under the command of Lieutenant John Williams, Thicknesse's predecessor on the previous Charlotte.

Other vessels
The Royal Navy also had a number of vessels under the name .

Lastly, the Royal Navy employed several hired armed cutters named . There was also a hired armed schooner .

Citations and references
Citations

References
 Hepper, David J. (1994) British Warship Losses in the Age of Sail, 1650-1859. (Rotherfield: Jean Boudriot). 

Royal Navy ship names